Miratovac is a village located in the municipality of Preševo, Serbia.

Demographics
According to the 2002 census, the town has a population of 2774 people. Of these, 2731 (98,44 %) were ethnic Albanians, 13 (0,46 %) were Serbs, 1 (0,03 %) Muslim, 1 (0,03 %) Bosniak, and 26 (0,93 %) others.

References

Populated places in Pčinja District
Albanian communities in Serbia